Berserk (meaning "very angry" or "out of control") may refer to:

 Berserk (manga), a 1989 Japanese manga by Kentaro Miura
 Berserk (1997 TV series), the first anime adaption of the manga
 Berserk (2016 TV series), a second adaptation
 Berserk: The Golden Age Arc, a film trilogy adaptation released in 2012 and 2013
 Berserk and the Band of the Hawk, a 2016 Berserk-themed spinoff of the Dynasty Warriors video game series
 Berserk (novel), by Ally Kennen
 Berserk!, a 1967 film starring Joan Crawford and Ty Hardin
 Berserk (robot), a military robot of Belarus
 "Berzerk" (song), by Eminem from MMLP2
 Berzerk (video game), released in 1980
 Bezerk (album), by Welsh glam metal band Tigertailz
 "Bezerk" (song), by Big Sean featuring ASAP Ferg

See also
 Apoptygma Berzerk, a Norwegian synthpop band
 Berserker (disambiguation)
 Berzék, a village in Borsod-Abaúj-Zemplén county, Hungary
 BZRK, a novel series by Michael Grant
 Zerker (disambiguation)